The first local newspaper in Bahrain was Al Bahrayn which was published between 1939 and 1944.

Bahrain's Information Affairs Authority reported that the number of newspapers in 1999 was four which were published in Arabic and English languages. There were a total of 12 dailies and weeklies in the country in 2012.

Below is a list of the newspapers published in Bahrain.

See also

Media of Bahrain
Culture of Bahrain
Lists of newspapers

References
Newspapers List of Bahrain

Newspapers
Bahrain
Newspapers published in Bahrain